Discordianism is a religion,  philosophy, or paradigm centered on Eris, also known as Discordia, the Goddess of strife and discord. Discordianism uses archetypes or ideals associated with her. It was founded after the 1963 publication of its "holy book," the Principia Discordia, written by Greg Hill with Kerry Wendell Thornley, the two working under the pseudonyms Malaclypse the Younger and Omar Khayyam Ravenhurst.

The religion has been likened to Zen based on similarities with absurdist interpretations of the Rinzai school, as well as Taoist philosophy. Discordianism is centered on the idea that both order and disorder are illusions imposed on the universe by the human nervous system, and that neither of these illusions of apparent order and disorder is any more accurate or objectively true than the other.

There is some discord as to whether Discordianism should be regarded as a parody religion, and if so, to what degree. It is difficult to estimate the number of Discordians because they are not required to hold Discordianism as their only belief system,<ref>Rabinovitch, Shelly & Lewis, James. The Encyclopedia of Modern Witchcraft and Neo-Paganism". Pp 75–76. Citadel Press. 2002. ISBN 0-8065-2406-5.</ref> and because there is an encouragement to form schisms and cabals.

 Founding and structure 
The foundational document of Discordianism is the Principia Discordia, fourth edition (1970), written by Malaclypse the Younger, an alias of Gregory Hill. The Principia Discordia often hints that Discordianism was founded as a dialectic antithesis to more popular religions based on order, although the rhetoric throughout the book describes chaos as a much more underlying impulse of the universe. This has been done with the intention of merely "balancing out" the tight order of society.

 Episkopos 
Episkoposes are the overseers of sects of Discordianism, who have presumably created their own sect of Discordianism. They speak to Eris through the use of their pineal gland. It is said in the Principia Discordia that Eris says different things to each listener. She may even say radically different things to each Episkopos, but all of what she says is equally her word (even if it contradicts another iteration of her word).

Most episkoposes have an assumed name and/or title of sometimes "bizarre" nature and self-proclaimed 'mystic import', such as Malaclypse the Younger, Omnibenevolent Polyfather of Virginity in Gold; Lord Omar Khayyam Ravenhurst, Bull Goose of Limbo; Professor Mu-Chao; Jay Bee the Elder; and Kassil the Erratic. Some Discordians choose their entire title by themselves, some turn to random generators, others assimilate things from other people, and a few never really offer any explanation.

 Popes 
According to the Principia Discordia, “every single man, woman, and child on this Earth” is a pope. Included in the Principia Discordia is an official Pope card that may be reproduced and distributed freely to anyone and everyone. Papacy is not granted through possession of this card; it merely informs people that they are “a genuine and authorized Pope” of Discordia.

This understanding of the notion of Pope has far reaching consequences in Discordianism. For example, the introduction to Principia Discordia says, “Only a Pope may canonize a Saint. ... So you can ordain yourself—and anyone or anything else—a Saint."

In most of his public presentations and lectures, Robert Anton Wilson's first gesture when taking the stage would be to declare everyone within the audience to be ordained Discordian Popes.

Saints

There are also five classes of saints within Discordianism, who are those who best act as exemplars and are closer to perfection. Only the first of these classes "Saint Second Class" contains real human beings (deceased and alive), with higher classes reserved for fictional beings who, by virtue of being fictional, are better able to reach the Discordian view of perfection.

A well-known example of a second-class saint is Emperor Norton, a citizen in 19th century San Francisco, who despite suffering delusions was beloved by much of the city. He is honoured as a saint within Discordianism for living his life according to truth as he saw it and a disregard for reality as others would perceive it.

 Mythology 
Eris and Aneris
In discordian mythology, Aneris is described as the sister of Eris a.k.a. Discordia. Whereas Eris/Discordia is the goddess of disorder and being, Aneris/Harmonia is the goddess of order and non-being.

"DOGMA III – HISTORY 32, 'COSMOGONY' " in Principia Discordia, states:

In the beginning there was VOID, who had two daughters; one (the smaller) was that of BEING, named ERIS, and one (the larger) was of NON-BEING, named ANERIS.

The sterile Aneris becomes jealous of Eris (who was born pregnant), and starts making existent things non-existent. This explains why life begins, and later ends in death.And to this day, things appear and disappear in this very manner.The names of Eris and Aneris (who are later given a brother, Spirituality), are used to show some fundamental Discordian principles in "Psycho-Metaphysics":

The Aneristic Principle is that of APPARENT ORDER; the Eristic Principle is that of APPARENT DISORDER. Both order and disorder are man made concepts and are artificial divisions of PURE CHAOS, which is a level deeper than is the level of distinction making.

Hand of Eris

The "five-fingered hand of Eris" (shown at right) is one of several symbols used in Discordianism. It was adapted as an astronomical/astrological symbol for the dwarf planet Eris. Initially, the planetary symbol, designed by Discordian Denis Moskowitz, was rotated 90 degrees and had a cross-bar added so that it resembled two lunate epsilons (Є) back-to-back, with epsilon being the Greek initial of 'Eris'. The cross-bar was later dropped, but the vertical orientation retained. (The Discordian symbol has no set orientation, but is most commonly horizontal.) The symbol has seen use in public-outreach publications by NASA, though planetary symbols play only a minor role in modern astronomy.

The "original snub"

The "original snub" is the Discordian name for the events leading up to the judgement of Paris, although more focus is put on the actions of Eris. Zeus believes that Eris is a troublemaker, so he does not invite her to Peleus and Thetis's wedding. Having been snubbed, Eris creates a golden apple with the word kallisti (“for the prettiest”) inscribed in it. This, the Apple of Discord, is a notable symbol in Discordianism for its inclusion in the Sacred Chao, and is traditionally described as being made of gold (although whether that gold was metallic or Acapulco is noted as uncertain).

Some recent interpretations of the original snub place Eris as being not at all mischievous with her delivery of the apple, but instead suggest that Eris was simply bringing the apple as a wedding gift for Thetis. This interpretation would see Eris as innocent and her causing of chaos as a by-product of the other wedding guests’ reactions upon seeing her at the wedding.

 Philosophy 
Three core principles
The Principia Discordia holds three core principles: the Aneristic and Eristic principles representing order and disorder, and the notion that both are mere illusions. The following excerpt summarizes these principles:

 Operation Mindfuck 
Operation Mindfuck is an important practice in the Discordian religion, in which "all national calamities, assassinations, or conspiracies" are publicly attributed to the Bavarian Illuminati, an 18th century secret society, in an attempt to "sow the culture with paranoia," as well as to highlight the absurdity of conspiracy theories. The concept was developed by Kerry Thornley and Robert Anton Wilson in 1968 and given its name by Wilson and Robert Shea in The Illuminatus! Trilogy.

Writings

Discordian works include a number of books, not all of which actually exist. Among those that have been published are Principia Discordia, first published in 1965 (which includes portions of The Honest Book of Truth); and The Illuminatus! Trilogy, which had its first volume published in 1975.

The Principia Discordia is a Discordian religious text written by Greg Hill (Malaclypse the Younger) with Kerry Wendell Thornley (Lord Omar Khayyam Ravenhurst). The phrase Principia Discordia, reminiscent of Newton's Principia Mathematica, is presumably intended to mean Discordant Principles, or Principles of Discordance.Summa Universalia was another work by Malaclypse the Younger, purported to be a summary of the universe. It was excerpted in the first edition of Principia but never published. It was mentioned in an introduction to one of the Principia editions, and the work was quoted from in the first edition.Zenarchy was first self-published by Thornley, under the pen name Ho Chi Zen, as a series of one-page (or broadsheet) newsletters in the 1960s. A selection of the material was later reedited and expanded by Thornley and republished in paperback by IllumiNet Press in 1991. The book describes Thornley's concept of Zenarchy "a way of Zen applied to social life. A non-combative, non-participatory, no-politics approach to anarchy intended to get the serious student thinking."

One of the most influential of all Discordian works, The Illuminatus! Trilogy is a series of three novels written by Robert Shea and Robert Anton Wilson purportedly between 1969 and 1971. In a 1980 interview given to the science fiction magazine Starship, Wilson suggested the novel was an attempt to build a myth around Discordianism. Zen Without Zen Masters is a book by Camden Benares (The Count of Five), published in 1977, of koans, stories and exercises of a Discordian nature. It includes tales of several early Discordians including Hill (as Mal) and Thornley (as Omar and Ho Chi Zen). "Enlightenment of a Seeker" from this book is also present in Principia Discordia as "A Zen Story".

Principia Discordia editions
The first edition was printed allegedly using Jim Garrison's Xerox printer in 1963. The second edition was published under the title Principia Discordia or How The West Was Lost in a limited edition of five copies (and released into the public domain) in 1965. 

In 1978, a copy of a work from Kerry Thornley titled THE PRINCIPIA DISCORDIA or HOW THE WEST WAS LOST was placed in the HSCA JFK collections as document 010857. Adam Gorightly, author of The Prankster and the Conspiracy about Kerry Thornley and the early Discordians, said the copy in the JFK collection was not a copy of the first edition but a later and altered version containing some of the original material. In an interview with researcher Brenton Clutterbuck, Gorightly said he had been given Greg Hill's copy of the first edition. This appeared in its entirety in Historia Discordia, a book on Discordian history released in spring of 2014.Adam Gorightly: "Historia Discordia" (2014). 

Several other editions have been published by Steve Jackson Games and others.

 Related works See also List of Discordian worksHistoria DiscordiaHistoria Discordia (2014) was compiled by Adam Gorightly with foreword by Robert Anton Wilson. It is a compilation of early Discordian photos, tracts, art collages, and more including works by Discordianism founders Greg Hill (Malaclypse the Younger) and Kerry Thornley (Omar Khayyam Ravenhurst). Among other things, it contains the long-missing The Honest Book of Truth and the first edition of Principia Discordia. It features a blurb by famed comic book writer Alan Moore.

Chasing ErisChasing Eris (2018) by Brenton Clutterbuck is a snapshot of the state of international Discordianism sixty years after its foundation, documenting "a cross-section of international Discordianism" and exploring its influences on counterculture, nerd culture, the copyleft movement, pop music and other art forms as well as connections to the assassination of John F. Kennedy, Charles Manson and the German secret service. The book includes several interviews and reports from the author's travels in North and South America, Australia, and Europe to meet Discordian individuals as well as whole groups. It also includes an interpretation of the Principia Discordia'' chapter "The Parable of The Bitter Tea" by its original author. It is reviewed on Goodreads and has gained the attention of websites such as RAWillumination.

See also 

 Chaos magic
 Discordian calendar
 Direct and indirect realism
 Poe's law
 Religious satire
 SNAFU Principle
 Symbol of Chaos
 Trivialism

References

External links 
 Erischan.org – A Discordian imageboard.
 Flying Squirrels on Fire Cabal – A Discordian sect.
 PrincipiaDiscordia.com – contains the Principia Discordia in HTML. Also has Discordian message boards and other resources.
 The Semi-Official Quasi-Clandestine Bavarian Illuminati/Discordian Archives An archive of early Discordian documents, photos and paraphernalia.
 Discordian Saints – 1999 archive from Andrew C. Bulhak.
 Discordian Tarot with 'Reading' – the free deck consists of 73 cards, incl. 23 Trumps (also as PDF, 0.7 MB)

 
Religious organizations established in 1963
Robert Anton Wilson
Eris (mythology)